Futarchy is a form of government proposed by economist Robin Hanson, in which elected officials define measures of national wellbeing, and prediction markets are used to determine which policies will have the most positive effect.

It was named by The New York Times as a buzzword of 2008. The idea of futarchy was later introduced in the context of blockchains and the DAO bringing it closer to an actual implementation.

Criticisms
Economist Tyler Cowen said
I would bet against the future of futarchy, or its likelihood of succeeding were it in place. Robin says "vote on values, bet on beliefs", but I don't think values and beliefs can be so easily separated.

References

External links
 

Forms of government